The rough-skinned horned toad or Tonkin spadefoot toad (Boulenophrys palpebralespinosa) is a species of frog in the family Megophryidae. It is found in southern China (Yunnan and Guangxi), northern Vietnam, and northern Laos (Phongsaly Province).

Boulenophrys palpebralespinosa is a small toad, measuring only  in length.

The tadpoles develop in clear mountain streams. It is threatened by habitat loss and degradation caused by rubber plantations, forest product collection, agricultural and forestry activities, fires, and presumably pollution.

References

Boulenophrys
Amphibians of China
Amphibians of Laos
Amphibians of Vietnam
Amphibians described in 1937
Taxa named by René Léon Bourret
Taxonomy articles created by Polbot